The Poet Reclining (Le Poète allongé) is a painting by Marc Chagall, painted in oils in 1915. It is owned by Tate Modern in London. In 2016 it was on display at the Towner Gallery in Eastbourne, Sussex.

References

External links
 The Poet Reclining at the Tate Modern

Paintings by Marc Chagall
1915 paintings
Collection of the Tate galleries
Horses in art
Pigs in art